Christopher Ross (born 1931 in New York) is an American designer and collector of militaria.  Ross has earned an international reputation for his animal wearable fine art and portrait sculpture.

Life 
Christopher Ross, the son of Captain Gustave Ross and grandson of New York Supreme Court Justice William P. Burr, was born and raised on the Upper East Side of New York. He spent his school years at the Fairfield Country Day School in Fairfield and Westport, Connecticut. Subsequently, he attended the Marie-José private boarding school in Gstaad, Switzerland. Ross completed his school education at the Millbrook School with Edward Pulling as his mentor, and then attended college (Collegiate School) in New York City.

Ross studied history and philosophy at Columbia University in New York. From 1955 to 1976, Ross was a partner at Brooks Harvey, which was then acquired by Morgan Stanley. He entered a partnership with Harry Helmsley, and in 1969 they founded a company together. As an investment banker he went to South America for two years and represented the interests of Southern Railroad, Venezuela, while his sister Sheilah Ross worked as a photo and cover model for Vogue and Harper's Bazaar in New York. In the mid-1970s Ross returned to the United States and devoted himself to sculpture and collecting European collectables from the period of Waterloo to 1914.

Ross has been awarded several design awards, such as the A'Design Award. In 2016, he was made hon. life fellow of the Royal Society of Arts (FRSA) and was officially selected artist for the annual summer exhibition of the Royal Scottish Academy of Art and Architecture in Edinburgh. In the same year Ross was nominated for the German Design Award in Frankfurt.

Work 

Ross’s wearable luxury art collection Animal Instinct is a series of animal inspired, limited edition pieces intricately crafted by the artist himself from antique sterling silver, 24-karat gold and Bohemian glass. 

His wearable fine art and portrait sculpture has been featured in numerous international fashion magazines such as Vogue, L’Officiel, Madame, Elle France, Harper’s Bazaar and magazine covers  such as Marie Claire and Malaysia Tatler. His jewellery has been seen in fashion shows, most recently at Fendi’s Limited Edition Experiences, Art Basel in Miami Beach 2009, Vendôme Luxury Paris 2010 and in 2016, at the Royal Scottish Academy in Edinburgh. His work was shown by the American fashion designer Rachel Roy at her Autumn/Winter Digital Runway Show 2013/2014, in New York City.

Public collections include:: the Eremitage St.Petersburg, Palais Galliera, Paris; The Metropolitan Museum of Art, New York; the National Museums of Scotland;  Yale University Art Gallery, Newark Museum, Newark; Kent State University Museum and Boston Museum of Fine Arts. Other collections are on view Chisholm Gallery in Wellington, Florida, USA.

Press - Catalogues - Directories 

 Ulrich Goette Himmelblau: Who's Who in Visual Art / 100 Top Fine Artists of Our Day. Art Domain Publisher, QUEDLINBURG/GERMANY, 2017 
 GrupoDuplex: Joyería Contemporánea. BARCELONA/SPAIN, 2016 Dep. Legal.: SA-555-2011
 DesignerPress: Award Winning Product & Industrial Design. Vol. 14-P, page 67, COMO/ITALY, 2016 
 DesignerPress: Award Winning Designs 2015-2016 A' Design Award YearBook. Digital Edition Book – PDF, COMO/ITALY, 2016 
 The Jones Group: Rachel Roy. Custom Digital Runway Lookbook. NEW YORK CITY/USA, 2014
 Studio XXb: BrickWorld. Vendôme Luxury Exhibition Catalogue, PARIS/FRANCE 2010
 Lurve Paris-Berlin: Hedonism. Bi-annual Collectible Edition Nr. 2, PARIS/FRANCE 2009 / 2010
 Hans Deumling: More Favourite Things. Eduard Meier GmbH, MUNICH/GERMANY 2008
 Agostino von Hassell: Military High Life, Elegant Food Histories and Recipes, University Press of the South Inc., New Orleans, LOUISIANA/USA,2006 
 Richard Martin, Harold Koda: Swords into Ploughshares. The Metropolitan Museum of Art, NEW YORK/USA 1995
 Christopher Buckley: Manhattan Town House. New York Special Edition. Architectural Digest,  NEW YORK/USA 1992
 Aardvark Publishing: The Great Bermuda Catalogue. HAMILTON/BERMUDA, 1987 
 Audra D.S Burch: Limited Edition Experiences turns Design District into style mecca. In: The Miami Herald, 12/2009
 Kyra Brenzinger: Christopher Ross, Un Artiste à Votre Taille. In: Gemme Paris, France, 6/2010
 Royal Scottish Academy of Art & Architecture, Annual Exhibition, Christopher Ross Exhibition EDINBURGH/SCOTLAND

References s

External links 
 
 AdesignAward Christopher Ross Profil

20th-century American sculptors
Living people
1931 births
21st-century American sculptors